Robert Hurst may refer to:

 Robert Hurst (scientist) (1915–1996), New Zealand-born British scientist and bomb disposal expert
 Robert Hurst (musician) (born 1964), American jazz bassist
 Robert Hurst (broadcaster), Canadian broadcaster
 Robert Hurst (1750–1843), Member of Parliament for Shaftesbury, 1802–1806, Steyning, 1802–1803 and 1806–1812, and Horsham, 1812–1829)
 Robert Henry Hurst (senior) (1788–1857), Member of Parliament for Horsham, 1832–1841 and 1844–1857
 Robert Henry Hurst (junior) (1817–1905), Member of Parliament for Horsham, 1865–1868, 1869–1874 and 1875–1876